KCBB may refer to:

 KCBB-LD, a low-power television station (channel 19, virtual 41) licensed to serve Boise, Idaho, United States
 KEVA-LD, a low-power television station (channel 34) licensed to serve Boise, Idaho, which held the call signs KCBB-LP or KCBB-LD from 2003 to 2021